Madhesi may refer to:

Madhesi people, a group of Nepalis residing in the Nepal Terai
Madhesi tribe, indigenous American people of the Madhesi valley
Madhesi Valley, a territory in the United States
Madhesh, a part of the Terai in Nepal

See also
 
 Madheshi
 Madhesh

Language and nationality disambiguation pages